Victoria Riptides (also known as the RipTides and Riptide) were a professional soccer team based out of Victoria, British Columbia.  The team played for two seasons; the 1984 season of the Pacific Coast Soccer League, and 1985 season of the Western Alliance Challenge Series. Their home games were played at Royal Athletic Park.

History
David Keith was coach of the Riptides for their first season during which the Riptides secured a record of 7 wins, 2 draws, and 1 loss. The team featured several prominent players including former Vancouver Whitecap, Frank Woods; Simon Keith, who joined the 'Tides after playing in the second tier of the British league for Millwall F.C.; Brian Mousley (Portland Timbers); local stand-out Rob Wallace who signed his first professional contract with the Riptides; as well as several Canadian National Team pool players: Doug Adlem, Glen Johnson and Scott Weinberg (University of Victoria).
 
In 1985, four independent west coast soccer clubs joined together to create an informal challenge series.  The challenge cup pitted the Riptides against F.C. Seattle, F.C. Portland and the San Jose Earthquakes in a home and away series.  The cup also included games against the Canadian national soccer team which was training for the 1986 World Cup in Vancouver, BC. The national team was not included in the standings.

Brian Hughes was the head coach to start the 1985 season, but was replaced mid-season by real-estate agent Buzz Parsons who also failed to produce winning results. The 1985 Riptides had a 3-1-3 record, finishing second from the bottom in the final standings.  The challenge series led to a discussion among the four teams about forming a permanent league or alliance.  The Riptides management at the time, disagreed with this approach and did not participate in future games in what became known as the Western Soccer Alliance. They also backed out of joining the newly forming Canadian Soccer Association. The Western Soccer Alliance became the Western Soccer League in 1989 which merged with the American Soccer League in 1990 to form the American Professional Soccer League.

Year-by-year

1984 Pacific Coast Soccer League

League final standings
GP = Games Played, W = Wins, T = Ties, L = Losses, GF = Goals For, GA = Goals Against, Pts= point system

2 points for a win, 1 point for a draw, 0 points for a loss.
-League Premiers (most points). -Other playoff teams.

Regular season results

Victoria Cup Final results

Exhibition results

Team management
  Joe Stott - president
  Dave Davies - general manager
  David Keith - head coach

1985 Western Alliance Challenge Series

Series final standings

Results by round

Exhibition match results

1985 Roster

Team management
  Harry Kuiack - president
  Drew Finerty - general manager
  Brian Hughes - head coach
  Bruce Twamley - assistant coach 
  Buzz Parsons - assistant coach, (became head coach in June)

See also
 Seattle Storm (soccer)
 Portland Timbers (1985–1990)
 Victoria Vistas (1989–1990)

References

External links
 http://davfal.powweb.com/museum/FCSeattleStorm.htm
 http://a-leaguearchive.tripod.com/1985/1985.htm

Pacific Coast Soccer League teams
Defunct soccer clubs in Canada
Soccer clubs in British Columbia
Western Soccer Alliance teams